The following lists events that happened during 2016 in Rwanda.

Incumbents
President: Paul Kagame
Prime Minister: Anastase Murekezi

Predicted and Scheduled Events

January
January 16-February 7 - 2016 African Nations Championship

August
August 5-21 - 3 athletes from Rwanda will compete in the 2016 Summer Olympics in Rio de Janeiro, Brazil

Sports
Rwanda at the 2016 Summer Olympics

 
2010s in Rwanda
Years of the 21st century in Rwanda